Groundbirch is a community in the north-east of British Columbia, Canada. It is on British Columbia Highway 97 approximately halfway between Dawson Creek and Chetwynd. On the east side there is Progress and to the west side there is East Pine. The Groundbirch Store is locally owned and operated. There are also two halls, the Groundbirch Hall and the McLeod Hall.

Peace River Country
Populated places in the Peace River Regional District
Unincorporated settlements in British Columbia